Further Temptations is the debut album by The Drones, originally released in 1977. The album included two re-recorded tracks ("Corgi Crap" and "Lookalikes") from their debut 7", Temptations of a White Collar Worker. In 1993, Anagram Records reissued the album on CD and included eight bonus tracks culled from the band's various singles.

Original track listing

Side 1
"Persecution Complex"	2:36
"Bone Idol" – 1:54
"Movement" – 2:51
"Be My Baby" – 3:19
"Corgi Crap" – 2:43
"Sad So Sad" – 2:38
"The Change" – 3:39

Side 2
"Lookalikes" – 2:36
"The Underdog" – 3:00
"No More Time" – 2:35
"City Drones" – 3:40
"Just Want To Be Myself" – 2:44
"Lift Off the Bans" – 2:37

Bonus tracks
"Lookalikes" (single version) – 2:34
"Corgi Crap" (single version) – 2:53
"Hard on Me" – 2:12
"You'll Lose" – 3:40
"Just Want To Be Myself" (single version) – 2:49
"Bone Idol" (single version) – 1:59
"Can't See" – 3:32
"Fooled Today" – 3:16

Albums produced by Steve Lillywhite
1977 debut albums
The Drones (English band) albums